Park Slope is a neighborhood in northwestern Brooklyn, New York City, within the area once known as South Brooklyn. Park Slope is roughly bounded by Prospect Park and Prospect Park West to the east, Fourth Avenue to the west, Flatbush Avenue to the north, and Prospect Expressway to the south. Generally, the section from Flatbush Avenue to Garfield Place (the "named streets") is considered the "North Slope", the section from 1st to 9th Street is considered the "Center Slope", and south from 9th Street, the "South Slope". The neighborhood takes its name from its location on the western slope of neighboring Prospect Park. Fifth Avenue and Seventh Avenue are its primary commercial streets, while its east–west side streets are lined with brownstones and apartment buildings.

Park Slope was settled by the Lenape before Europeans arrived in the 17th century. The area was mostly farms and woods until the early 19th century, when the land was subdivided into rectangular parcels. The western section of the neighborhood was occupied in the mid-19th century, being located near the industrial Gowanus Canal and ferries. After the completion of Prospect Park, numerous mansions and rowhouses were developed in Park Slope's eastern section in the 1880s. Park Slope faced social and infrastructural decline in the mid-20th century, but the building stock was renovated after the area became gentrified starting in the 1960s. Much of the neighborhood is overlaid by the Park Slope Historic District, which is composed of a National Historic District and a New York City landmark district.

Park Slope features historic buildings, top-rated restaurants, bars, and shops, as well as proximity to Prospect Park, the Brooklyn Academy of Music, the Brooklyn Botanic Garden, the Brooklyn Museum, the Brooklyn Conservatory of Music, and the Central Library and Park Slope branches of the Brooklyn Public Library. The neighborhood had a population of about 62,200 as of the 2000 census. Park Slope is generally ranked as  one of New York City's most desirable neighborhoods.

Park Slope is part of Brooklyn Community District 6, and its primary ZIP Codes are 11215 and 11217. It is patrolled by the 78th Precinct of the New York City Police Department. Politically, it is represented by the New York City Council's 33rd and 39th Districts.

History

Early settlement
Though modern-day Brooklyn is coextensive with Kings County, this was not always the case. South Brooklyn, an area in central Kings County extending to the former Brooklyn city line near Green-Wood Cemetery's southern border, was originally settled by the Canarsee Indians, one of several indigenous Lenape peoples who farmed and hunted on the land. The Lenape typically lived in wigwams, and had larger fishing and hunting communities near freshwater sites on higher land. Several Lenape roads crossed the landscape and were later widened into "ferry roads" by 17th-century Dutch settlers, since they were used to provide transport to the waterfront. One was the Flatbush Road, running roughly north–south to the east of the path of present-day Flatbush Avenue. Just north of modern-day Park Slope was the Jamaica Road, running east to Jamaica, Queens, on what is now the path of Fulton Street.

The first European settlement occurred in 1637-1639 when Willem Kieft, the Dutch West India Company's director, purchased almost all land in what is now Brooklyn and Queens. The area was used as farmland over the next two centuries.

During the American Revolutionary War, on August 27, 1776, the Park Slope area served as the backdrop for the beginning of the Battle of Long Island. In this battle, over 10,000 British soldiers and Hessian mercenaries routed outnumbered American forces, which resulted in the British occupation of Long and Staten Islands. The Battle Pass site is now preserved in Prospect Park, while on Fifth Avenue, there is a reconstruction of the Old Stone House, a farmhouse where a countercharge covered the American retreat.

19th century

Early development 
Transit from Park Slope improved in the early 19th century. The Brooklyn, Jamaica and Flatbush Turnpike Company was incorporated in 1809 to widen the Flatbush and Jamaica ferry roads, prior to the establishment of the Fulton Ferry to Manhattan in 1814. Afterward, stagecoaches started running on Flatbush Road in 1830, with omnibus service following four years later. The land comprising what is now Park Slope was still mostly undeveloped . There were a couple of houses on and around Prospect Hill, a tavern, and a resort; the section of Flatbush Road through present-day Prospect Park contained ponds of standing water, which caused fevers and other illnesses. Soon afterward, the land was split up into rectangular parcels, which were bought by numerous people and cultivated as farmland. As in the rest of Kings County, the farmland was likely dependent on slave labor.

The farm parcels were further split in the 19th century, allowing for the development of smaller urban lots. After Brooklyn was incorporated as a city in 1834, the Commissioners Plan of 1839 was devised, a street plan that extended to South Brooklyn. Park Slope was originally located in the northern section of the Eighth Ward, which at the time was the city's least populous ward.

The Brooklyn and Jamaica Railroad started running on Atlantic Avenue, north of Park Slope, in 1836. The railroad's presence did not hasten the slow rate of residential growth in South Brooklyn because the locomotives provided slow and inefficient service. Horse-drawn railcar companies provided competition to the railroad: the first, the Brooklyn City Railroad, was founded in 1853. Other streetcar routes were founded, including a line on Flatbush Avenue in 1875, as well as the Atlantic Avenue Company's Fifth Avenue and Ninth Avenue lines, the latter of which served the Eighth Ward directly.

Prospect Park and further development 
The first plans to develop modern-day Park Slope arose in 1847 when Colonel Daniel Richards requested permission from the Brooklyn Common Council to develop the Eighth Ward's streets. Richards also proposed the renovation of the nearby Gowanus Creek into a canal, including draining the marshes in its watershed. Between 1849 and 1860, under a decree by the New York Legislature, the Gowanus Creek was deepened. Simultaneously, a local lawyer and railroad developer named Edwin Clarke Litchfield (1815–1885) purchased large tracts of what was then farmland, erecting his Litchfield Villa on the east side of the neighborhood in 1857. Through the American Civil War era, Litchfield sold off much of his land to residential developers.

Development increased with the planning and creation of Prospect Park, just east of modern-day Park Slope. In February 1860, a group of fifteen commissioners had submitted suggestions for locations of four large parks and three small parks in Brooklyn. The largest of these proposed parks was a  plot east of Ninth and Tenth Avenue in the Eighth Ward. After work was stopped during the Civil War, the proposed park's boundaries were changed, shifting the boundaries slightly west and south. In 1868, the City of Brooklyn purchased his estate and adjoining property to complete the West Drive and the southern portion of the Long Meadow in Prospect Park, for the then-exorbitant price of $1.7 million ($ million in ). The modern-day Park Slope was split into the city's 22nd Ward the same year.

By the late 1870s, with horse-drawn rail cars running to the park and the ferry, bringing many rich New Yorkers in the process, urban sprawl dramatically changed the neighborhood into a streetcar suburb. The opening of the Brooklyn Bridge in 1883 led to further development in the city of Brooklyn. The Brooklyn Union Elevated Railroad extended its Fifth Avenue elevated line to South Brooklyn six years later. During the 1890s, the Brooklyn Rapid Transit Company added electric trolley lines or converted old stagecoach lines to electric service.

Upscale residential neighborhood 

Many of the large Victorian mansions on Prospect Park West, known as the Gold Coast, were built in the 1880s and 1890s to take advantage of the park views. Early colloquial names for the neighborhood included "Prospect Heights" (later applied to the neighborhood north of Prospect Park), "Prospect Hill", and "Park Hill Side", before residents settled on Park Slope. By 1883, with the opening of the Brooklyn Bridge, Park Slope continued to boom and subsequent brick and brownstone structures pushed the neighborhood's borders farther. The 1890 census showed Park Slope to be the richest community in the United States. Realtors and community members saw a clear connection between Park Slope's bucolic setting and the comfort of living there. As the New York Tribune wrote in 1899, "Nature set the park down where it is, and man has embellished her work in laying out great lawns and artificial lakes, in bringing together menageries and creating conservatories, in making roads and driveways, and in doing everything in his power to make the place a pleasant pleasure ground and a charming resort."

Baseball had also played a prominent role in the history of the Park Slope area. From 1879 to 1889, the Brooklyn Atlantics played at Washington Park on 5th Avenue between 3rd and 4th Streets. When the park was destroyed by a fire, the team moved to two other sites. In 1898, the "New" Washington Park was built between Third and Fourth Avenues and between First and Third Streets near the Gowanus Canal. The team, by this point known as the Dodgers, played to an ever-growing fan base at this location, and team owner Charles Ebbets moved the team to his Ebbets Field stadium in Flatbush for the beginning of the 1913 season.

20th century to present 
Following Brooklyn's subsumption into the City of Greater New York in 1898 and accelerating in the 1910s, many wealthy and upper middle-class families fled for the suburban life, initially to outlying Brooklyn and Queens neighborhoods (such as nearby Flatbush) and thence more distant locales in Westchester County, Nassau County and New Jersey amid the adoption of the automobile. Manhattan gained economic and cultural dominance in the consolidated city, helped by transportation improvements like the subway, which brought a more heterogeneous population to Brooklyn. Existing families adapted by relocating to exclusive districts in the other boroughs, most notably the Upper East Side. Accordingly, Park Slope gradually became a more working class neighborhood amid the subdivision of the expansive Victorian-era housing stock into apartment buildings and rooming houses.

The socioeconomic changes were slowed by the ongoing development of upscale apartment houses on Prospect Park West and Plaza Street along with infill middle-class buildings throughout the neighborhood. Only a fraction of the area, centered in the traditional Gold Coast district and select adjoining blocks, retained wealthy and upper middle-class residents into the 1940s. The Emery Roth-designed 35 Prospect Park West, marketed as a competitor to the upscale apartment houses of Fifth Avenue, Park Avenue and Central Park West, opened right before the Great Depression in 1929, and contained a variety of luxury accommodations (including penthouses, duplexes and maisonettes) alongside "just plain apartments". While the building attracted such notable residents as pharmaceutical executive John L. Smith and remained a "solid fortress of wealth" for decades, it ultimately failed to anchor comparable development in the neighborhood.

By the 1950s, the working-class Italian-American and Irish-American populations predominated, though this changed by the 1970s as the black and Latino population of the area increased and the white ethnic population began to relocate amid the less exclusive, though effectively segregated, wave of postwar suburbanization. However, the area straddling Flatbush and Washington Avenues between Prospect Park and Atlantic Avenue began to attract a population that was mostly African-American and West Indian-American, similar to neighboring Crown Heights. This area was increasingly identified as the separate neighborhood of Prospect Heights, a moniker that had previously been used to identify areas of Park Slope outside the Gold Coast.

Some of those that remained reacted violently to the ethnic changes to the neighborhood; for example, white residents of Park Slope attempted to bar African-Americans from participating in after-school programs at William Alexander Middle School in 1966. After this failed, white teenagers engaged in firebomb attacks on African-American homes on Fourth Street. In 1968, a street fight between Italian and African-American gangs occurred at Fifth Avenue and President Street, using bricks and bottles as weapons; in the aftermath of the fight, fourteen African-Americans and three Italian-Americans were arrested.

On December 16, 1960, two airliners collided above Staten Island, killing 134 people in what was the worst U.S. aviation disaster at that time. One of the airplanes, a Douglas DC-8 operated by United Airlines, was able to stay airborne for a few miles before crashing near the corner of Sterling Place and Seventh Avenue. Everyone on board was instantly killed, except for one 11-year-old boy, Stephen Baltz, who died the following night at New York Methodist Hospital.  Six people on the ground were also killed.

In the late 1960s and early 1970s, the renovation of a now-$4.8 million brownstone along Berkeley Place sparked a trend where the rest of the brownstones were cleaned up and the grittiness of the neighborhood began to fade. Young professionals began to buy and renovate brownstones (which only cost around $15,000–35,000 at the time), often converting them from rooming houses into single and two-family homes. Preservationists helped secure landmark status for many of the neighborhood's blocks of historic row houses, brownstone, and Queen Anne, Renaissance Revival, and Romanesque mansions. After the 1973 creation of the landmark district, primarily above 7th Avenue, the rate of gentrification was sped up, and throughout the 1970s, the area saw an influx of young professional couples.

By the early 1980s, however, even as the gentrification of the neighborhood was rapidly proceeding, crime was soaring, along with crime in the rest of New York City. In addition to a rumored crack house near Prospect Park, the neighborhood was affected by daily muggings and shootings. Gentrification accelerated during the 1980s and 1990s as working-class families were generally replaced by upper-middle-class people being priced out of Manhattan or Brooklyn Heights. Following decades of socioeconomic precarity, the influx of the upper middle-class has returned Park Slope to its Gilded Age milieu as one of the wealthiest neighborhoods in Brooklyn—and the nation. Sociologist and urban theorist Sharon Zukin has written of the trend, "In Park Slope, the middle class found a sense of history and a picturesque quality that fit their sense of themselves." Since the mid-1990s, gentrification has increased: a 2001 report by the New York City Rent Guidelines Board found that from 1990 to 1999, rents in Park Slope increased by 3.5–4.4% per year, depending on what kind of building the apartment was in.

Land use
Park Slope contains a variety of zoning districts, including manufacturing, commercial, residential, and mixed-use. Much of the neighborhood is composed of rowhouses and six-to-eight-story apartment buildings, though Fourth, Fifth and Seventh Avenues contain residential structures with commercial space on the ground floors. The westernmost portion of Park Slope near the Gowanus Canal is a light industrial district. The section of Seventh Avenue south of Ninth Street is largely zoned for low-density commercial use.

Official landmarks 
Much of Park Slope is located within the Park Slope Historic District, which was listed on the National Register of Historic Places in 1980. The historic district was also designated by the city's Landmarks Preservation Commission in 1973; the city-designated district was extended to the south in 2012 and to the north in 2016. Containing 2,575 buildings stretching over part or all of around 40 city blocks, the historic district is New York's largest landmark neighborhood.

Several other structures in Park Slope are both NRHP and city landmarks:
 14th Regiment Armory, an armory built in 1891–95 and designed in the Late Victorian style
 Litchfield Villa, an Italianate mansion built in 1854–1857 on a large private estate now located in Prospect Park
 Public Bath No. 7, a bathhouse built between 1906 and 1910 in the style of a Renaissance palazzo
 Public School 39, built in 1876–1877 in the Italianate and Second Empire styles
 William B. Cronyn House, built in 1856 in the Second Empire style

Additionally, the Brooklyn Public Library's Park Slope branch, a Carnegie library built in 1905–06, is a city landmark. The Fourth Avenue station and 15th Street–Prospect Park station are NRHP landmarks that are part of the New York City Subway System Multiple Property Submission (MPS). The Old Stone House, a 1930 reconstruction of the Vechte-Cortelyou House destroyed in 1897, is another NRHP listing and is located on Third Street between Fourth and Fifth Avenues. The Grand Prospect Hall, an NRHP-listed banquet hall on Prospect Avenue, was built in 1892.

Demographics 
Based on data from the 2010 United States Census, the population of the Park Slope–Gowanus neighborhood tabulation area was 67,649, a change of 386 (0.6%) from the 67,263 counted in 2000.

The racial makeup of the neighborhood was 67.3% (45,529) White, 6.4% (4,334) African American, 0.1% (77) Native American, 6% (4,056) Asian, 0% (19) Pacific Islander, 0.5% (318) from other races, and 3% (2,053) from two or more races. Hispanic or Latino of any race were 16.6% (11,263) of the population.

The entirety of Community Board 6, which covers areas around Park Slope and Carroll Gardens, had 109,351 inhabitants as of NYC Health's 2018 Community Health Profile, with an average life expectancy of 81.4 years. This is slightly higher than the median life expectancy of 81.2 for all New York City neighborhoods. Most inhabitants are middle-aged adults and youth: 18% are between the ages of 0 and 17, 46% between 25 and 44, and 20% between 45 and 64. The ratio of college-aged and elderly residents was lower, at 5% and 10% respectively.

As of 2016, the median household income in Community District 6 was $134,804. In 2018, an estimated 10% of Park Slope and Carroll Gardens residents lived in poverty, compared to 21% in all of Brooklyn and 20% in all of New York City. Less than one in fifteen residents (6%) were unemployed, compared to 9% in the rest of both Brooklyn and New York City. Rent burden, or the percentage of residents who have difficulty paying their rent, is 37% in Park Slope and Carroll Gardens, lower than the citywide and boroughwide rates of 52% and 51% respectively. Based on this calculation, Park Slope and Carroll Gardens are considered to be high income and not gentrifying.

As of the 2020 census data from New York City Department of City Planning, there were between 30,000 to 39,999 White residents and 5,000 to 9,999 Hispanic residents, meanwhile the Black and Asian residents were each less than 5000 residents.

Police and crime
Park Slope is patrolled by the 78th Precinct of the NYPD, located at 65 6th Avenue. The 78th Precinct ranked 41st safest out of 69 patrol areas for per-capita crime in 2010. , with a non-fatal assault rate of 30 per 100,000 people, Park Slope and Carroll Gardens' rate of violent crimes per capita is less than that of the city as a whole. The incarceration rate of 294 per 100,000 people is lower than that of the city as a whole.

The 78th Precinct has a lower crime rate than in the 1990s, with crimes across all categories having decreased by 84.0% between 1990 and 2019. The precinct reported 0 murders, 11 rapes, 79 robberies, 99 felony assaults, 104 burglaries, 497 grand larcenies, and 40 grand larcenies auto in 2019.

Fire safety 
The New York City Fire Department (FDNY) operates three fire stations in Park Slope:
 Engine Co. 220/Ladder Co. 122 – 530 11th Street
 Engine Co. 239 – 395 4th Avenue
 Squad 1/Technical Response Vehicle – 788 Union Street

Health 
, preterm births and births to teenage mothers are less common in Park Slope and Carroll Gardens than in other places citywide. In Park Slope and Carroll Gardens, there were 27 preterm births per 1,000 live births (compared to 87 per 1,000 citywide), and 7.9 births to teenage mothers per 1,000 live births (compared to 19.3 per 1,000 citywide). Park Slope and Carroll Gardens has a relatively high population of residents who are uninsured, or who receive healthcare through Medicaid. In 2018, this population of uninsured residents was estimated to be 22%, which is higher than the citywide rate of 12%.

Fifteen percent of Park Slope and Carroll Gardens residents are smokers, which is slightly higher than the city average of 14% of residents being smokers. In Park Slope and Carroll Gardens, 15% of residents are obese, 6% are diabetic, and 22% have high blood pressure—compared to the citywide averages of 24%, 11%, and 28% respectively. In addition, 9% of children are obese, compared to the citywide average of 20%.

Eighty-six percent of residents eat some fruits and vegetables every day, which is slightly lower than the city's average of 87%. In 2018, 88% of residents described their health as "good," "very good," or "excellent," greater than the city's average of 78%. For every supermarket in Park Slope and Carroll Gardens, there are 12 bodegas.

New York-Presbyterian Brooklyn Methodist Hospital is located in Park Slope.

Post offices and ZIP Codes
Park Slope is covered by two ZIP Codes: 11217 north of Union Street and 11215 south of Union Street. The United States Post Office operates three locations nearby:
 Prospect Park West Station – 225 Prospect Park West
 Park Slope Station – 198 7th Avenue
 Van Brunt Station – 279 9th Street

Community 
Park Slope is considered one of New York City's most desirable neighborhoods. In 2010, it was ranked number 1 in New York by New York Magazine, citing its quality public schools, dining, nightlife, shopping, access to public transit, green space,  safety, and creative capital, among other aspects. It was named one of the "Greatest Neighborhoods in America" by the American Planning Association in 2007, "for its architectural and historical features and its diverse mix of residents and businesses, all of which are supported and preserved by its active and involved citizenry." In December 2006, Natural Home magazine named Park Slope one of America's ten best neighborhoods based on criteria including parks, green spaces and neighborhood gathering spaces; farmers' markets and community gardens; public transportation and locally owned businesses; and environmental and social policy.

Institutions 
 The Park Slope Food Coop, one of the oldest and largest active food co-ops in the United States, is located on Union Street has approximately 17,000 members from Park Slope and other neighborhoods. Only members may shop there, and membership requires a work commitment of 2 hours every six weeks.
 The Park Slope Volunteer Ambulance Corps provides free emergency medical services to community members.
 The Brooklyn Conservatory of Music, part of the Brooklyn Queens Conservatory of Music, is a community music school, offering music classes, ensembles and choral opportunities, and individual instrumental and vocal lessons to students from 18 months old to adults. It was founded in 1897.
 Christian Help, Inc. Park Slope (CHiPS) is a soup kitchen that serves 200-250 men and women daily. Its Frances Residency Program provides shelter and support for young homeless mothers and their infants and toddlers; it was founded in 1971.

Religion 

Park Slope is home to a wide variety of religious institutions, or houses of worship, including many churches and synagogues; most are historic buildings, and date back many decades.

Churches
 All Nations Baptist Church (Baptist)
 All Saints' Church (Episcopal)
 Church of Gethsemane (Presbyterian)
 Grace United Methodist Church of Brooklyn (Methodist)
 Greenwood Baptist Church (Baptist)
 Kingsboro Temple of Seventh-day Adventists (Seventh-day Adventist)
 Holy Name of Jesus (Roman Catholic)
 Memorial Baptist Church (Baptist)
 Old First Reformed Church (Reformed)
 Park Slope United Methodist Church (Methodist)
 Resurrection Coptic Catholic Chapel (Coptic)
 St Augustine (Roman Catholic)
 St Francis Xavier (Roman Catholic)
 St John's (Episcopal)
 St John–St Matthew–Emanuel (Lutheran [ELCA])
 St Mary's (Melkite Eastern Rite Catholic)
 St Saviour's (Roman Catholic)
 St Thomas Aquinas (Roman Catholic)
 Trinity Grace Church (Non-Denominational)
 Emmanuel Pentecostal Church (Pentecostal)

Judaism and synagogues
There is a significant Jewish population in Park Slope, allowing for a number of synagogues along the religious spectrum. In addition to a number of synagogues, there is an eruv, sponsored by members of the various communities, that surrounds Park Slope.

Synagogues include:
 Park Slope Jewish Center (Conservative), 14th Street and Eighth Avenue
 Congregation B'nai Jacob (Modern Orthodox), 401 9th Street
 Congregation Beth Elohim (Reform), 274 Garfield Place; this is the largest Reform synagogue in Brooklyn, and also the longest-running congregation
 Congregation Kolot Chayeinu (unaffiliated, progressive), 1012 Eighth Avenue

Education 
Park Slope and Carroll Gardens generally have a much higher ratio of college-educated residents than the rest of the city . The majority (74%) of residents age 25 and older have a college education or higher, while 9% have less than a high school education and 17% are high school graduates or have some college education. By contrast, 40% of Brooklynites and 38% of city residents have a college education or higher. The percentage of Park Slope and Carroll Gardens students excelling in reading and math has been increasing, with reading achievement rising from 41 percent in 2000 to 53 percent in 2011, and math achievement rising from 35 percent to 64 percent within the same time period.

Park Slope and Carroll Gardens's rate of elementary school student absenteeism is lower than the rest of New York City. In Park Slope and Carroll Gardens, 11% of elementary school students missed twenty or more days per school year, compared to the citywide average of 20% of students. Additionally, 77% of high school students in Park Slope and Carroll Gardens graduate on time, higher than the citywide average of 75% of students.

Schools

Public schools 
Public schools are operated by the New York City Department of Education. Park Slope is in two different community school districts – district 13 to the north and district 15 to the south. Students are zoned to their nearest elementary school. Both district 13 and district 15 place students in middle school based on the student's ranking of acceptable middle schools; the district 13 portion of Park Slope receives district 15 (not district 13) middle school choice, consistent with the rest of the neighborhood. The former John Jay High School is now the John Jay Educational Campus, housing three high schools and one combination middle/high school.
 PS 10, Magnet School of Math, Science, and Design Technology (grades K-5, dist. 15)
 PS 39, Henry Bristow School (grades PK-5, dist. 15)
 PS 107, John W. Kimball Learning Center (grades K–5, dist. 15)
 PS 118, the Maurice Sendak Community School (grades PK-5, dist. 15)
 PS 124, Silas B. Dutcher Elementary School (grades PK-5, dist. 15)
 PS 133, William A. Butler School (grades PK-5, dist. 13, with admissions open to both dist. 13 and 15)
 PS/MS 282, Park Slope School (grades PK-8, dist. 13)
 PS 321, the William Penn School (grades K-5, dist. 15)
 MS 51, William Alexander Middle School (grades 6–8, dist. 15)
 JHS 88 Peter Rouget (grades 6–8, dist. 15)
 MS 266, Park Place School (grades 6–8, dist. 13)
 John Jay Educational Campus (formerly John Jay HS, dist. 15). The building houses four schools:
 Park Slope Collegiate (grades 6-12)
 Millennium Brooklyn High School (grades 9-12)
 Cyberarts Studio Academy (grades 9-12)
 Secondary School for Law (grades 9-12)

Private schools
 Beth Elohim Day School (preK-K) on Eighth Avenue and Garfield Place.
 Berkeley Carroll School (preK–12) on Lincoln Place, between Seventh and Eighth Avenues; Carroll Street, between Sixth and Seventh Avenues; and President Street, between Sixth and Seventh Avenues.
 Brooklyn Free School (ages 5–15) on Sixteenth Street, between Fourth and Fifth Avenues. See democratic education.
 Bishop Ford Central Catholic High School (9–12) 500 19th St.
 Chai Tots Preschool Corner of Prospect Park West and 3rd St.
 Montessori School of New York (ages 2–13) on Eighth Avenue between Carroll and President Streets. See Montessori.
 Old First Nursery School (pre-K) the oldest cooperative nursery school in New York City located on Carroll Street at Seventh Avenue. The school has rented space from Old First for over forty years but is independent and not religiously affiliated with the church.
 Poly Prep's Lower School (part of Poly Prep Country Day School) (PreK-4) on Prospect Park West between First and Second Streets.
 St. Francis Xavier (Catholic School) (K-8). 763 President St. between 6th & 7th Avenue.
 St. Saviour Elementary School (Catholic School) (preK-8) 8th Ave between 7th and 8th Street
 St. Saviour High School (all-girls Catholic School) (9-12) 6th Street between 8th Avenue and Prospect Park West
 St. Joseph the Worker Catholic Academy 241 Prospect Park West (preK (age 3)-8)

Libraries
The Brooklyn Public Library's Park Slope branch is located at 431 Sixth Avenue. Built in 1906, it was a Carnegie library branch, and was named the "Prospect branch" before 1975. The Brooklyn Central Library is located across Grand Army Plaza from the northeast corner of Park Slope.

Transportation

The neighborhood is well-served by the New York City Subway. The IND Culver Line runs along Ninth Street, a main shopping street, stopping at Fourth Avenue, Seventh Avenue and 15th Street – Prospect Park/Prospect Park West. The IRT Eastern Parkway Line runs under Flatbush Avenue with an express stop at Atlantic Avenue – Barclays Center, and local stops (served by the ) at Bergen Street and Grand Army Plaza. The BMT Fourth Avenue Line's local trains serve Prospect Avenue, Ninth Street, and Union Street stations, with the  all serving Atlantic Avenue–Barclays Center, an express station. The BMT Brighton Line also passes through the neighborhood under Flatbush Avenue making stops at Atlantic Avenue–Barclays Center and Seventh Avenue. All three stations at Atlantic Avenue are connected to each other.

Additionally, several MTA New York City Transit bus routes serve the area, including the B61, B63, B67, and B69.

Notable people 

Actors
 Jon Abrahams (born 1977)
 Paul Bettany (born 1971), actor.
 Steve Buscemi (born 1957)
 Jennifer Connelly (born 1970), actress.
 David Cross (born 1964)
 Kathryn Erbe (born 1966)
 Laurence Fishburne (born 1961)
 Maggie Gyllenhaal (born 1977), actress.
 John Hodgman (born 1971), author, actor, and humorist.
 Robin Johnson (born 1964), actress.
 Terry Kinney (born 1954), actor and theatre director, who is a founding member of the Steppenwolf Theatre Company.
 Athan Maroulis (born 1964), actor, vocalist and record producer.
 Kelly McGillis (born 1957), actress.
 Wentworth Miller (born 1972), actor, model, screenwriter and producer.
 Sarah Paulson (born 1974), actress.
 Colin Quinn (born 1959), stand-up comedian, actor and writer, best known for his work on Saturday Night Live.
 Keri Russell (born 1976), actress and dancer.
 Peter Sarsgaard (born 1971), actor.
 Streeter Seidell (born 1982), comedian, writer, actor, and TV host.
 Michael Showalter (born 1970), comedian, actor, producer, writer, and director.
 Patrick Stewart (born 1940), actor whose career has included roles on stage, television, and film.
 Julia Stiles (born 1981), actress
 John Turturro (born 1957),  actor, writer and filmmaker.
 John Ventimiglia (born 1963), actor best known for his role as Artie Bucco in the HBO television series, The Sopranos

Athletes
 Adam Ottavino (born 1985), Major League Baseball player
 Joe Pepitone (1940-2023), MLB first baseman and outfielder who played for the New York Yankees

Musicians
 Foxy Brown (born 1978), rapper, model, and actress.
 Jim Black (born 1967), jazz drummer.
 Vince Clarke (born 1960), musician and songwriter.
 Ravi Coltrane (born 1965), Jazz saxophonist.
 Jonathan Coulton (born 1970), singer-songwriter.
 Simone Dinnerstein (born 1972), classical pianist.
 Dave Douglas (born 1963), jazz trumpeter and composer.
 Mark Feldman (born 1955), jazz violinist.
 Michael Hearst (born 1972),  composer, multi-instrumentalist, writer, producer and founding member of One Ring Zero.
 Angélique Kidjo (born 1960), singer-songwriter.
 Scott Klopfenstein (born 1977), musician and a former member of the band Reel Big Fish.
 Talib Kweli born 1975), hip hop recording artist.
 John Linnell (born 1959), singer-songwriter of They Might Be Giants.
 Kristen Anderson-Lopez and Robert Lopez (born 1975), songwriters / composers who wrote the song "Let It Go" for the movie Frozen.
 Ingrid Michaelson (born 1979), singer and songwriter.
 Pumpkinhead (1975-2015), rapper and hip hop artist.
 Geoff Rickly (born 1979, lead singer and songwriter of Thursday.
 Chris Speed (born 1967), saxophonist, clarinetist and composer.
 Smoosh, band.
 Scott Tixier (born 1986), jazz violinist and recording artist.
 Michael Weiss (born 1958),  jazz pianist and composer.
 Dan Zanes,  member of the 1980s band The Del Fuegos.

Artists
 Janine Antoni (born 1964), contemporary artist, who creates work in performance art, sculpture and photography.
 Jean-Michel Basquiat (1960-1988), artist best known for his neo-expressionist paintings.
 Alex Grey (born 1953), visionary artist, author, teacher and Vajrayana practitioner.
 Brett Helquist (born 1966), illustrator best known for his work in A Series of Unfortunate Events.
 Paul Ramirez Jonas (born 1965), contemporary artist and arts educator.
 Byron Kim (born 1961), contemporary artist.
 Joe Mangrum (born 1969), artist best known for his large-scale colored sand paintings.
 David Rees (born 1972), cartoonist, humorist and cultural critic.
 Lisa Sigal (born 1962), contemporary artist.
 Joan Snyder (born 1940), painter.
 Lane Twitchell (born 1967), contemporary visual artist.

Writers
 Paul Auster (born 1947), author whose works include The Brooklyn Follies
 Franco Ambriz, playwright and director
 Joan Bauer (born 1951), author of young adult fiction
 Richard Bernstein (born 1944), journalist who writes the Letter from America column for The International Herald Tribune
 Peter Blauner (born 1959), author, journalist and television producer
 Howard Bloom (born 1943), publicist and author
 Charles M. Blow (born 1970), columnist for The New York Times
 Helen Boyd (born 1969), author of two books about her relationship with her transgender partner
 Arthur Bradford (born 1969), writer and filmmaker
 Jane Brody (born 1941), author on science and nutrition topics
 Bruce Brooks (born 1950), writer of young adult and children's literature
 Rudolph Delson (born 1975), author best known for his 2007 debut novel, Maynard and Jennica
 Andrea Dworkin (1946-2005), radical feminist and writer best known for her criticism of pornography
 Dave Eggers (born 1970), author of A Heartbreaking Work of Staggering Genius
 Jennie Fields (born 1953), novelist
 Jonathan Safran Foer (born 1977), author whose novels include Extremely Loud & Incredibly Close
 Rozanne Gold, chef, journalist and cookbook author
 Ben Greenman (born 1969), novelist, author and magazine journalist
 Pete Hamill (1935-2020), journalist who was a columnist and editor for the New York Post and New York Daily News
 Colin Harrison (born 1960), author whose books include Manhattan Nocturne
 Kathryn Harrison (born 1961), author
 Lindsey Kelk, chick lit author and journalist
 John Hodgman (born 1971), author, actor and humorist
 Siri Hustvedt (born 1955), novelist and essayist who wrote The Sorrows of an American
 Steven Berlin Johnson (born 1968), author
 Norton Juster (1929-2021), writer
 Jim Knipfel (born 1965), novelist and journalist
 Nicole Krauss (born 1974), author of Man Walks Into a Room, The History of Love and Great House
 Jhumpa Lahiri (born 1967), author whose story collection Interpreter of Maladies (1999) won the 2000 Pulitzer Prize for Fiction
 Jonathan Lethem (born 1964), novelist
 Clifford J. Levy
 Michael Patrick MacDonald (born 1966), anti-crime activist
 Daisy Martinez, actress and author
 Rick Moody (born 1961), novelist
 Mary Morris (born 1947), author and professor at Sarah Lawrence College
 Itamar Moses (born 1977), playwright, author, television writer
 Melissa Holbrook Pierson (born 1957), writer and essayist of non-fiction
 Robert Reuland (born 1963), writer and criminal lawyer
 Adam Roberts (stage name Amateur Gourmet)
 Elizabeth Royte, writer
 Lucy Sante (born 1954), writer and critic
 Brian Selznick (born 1966), illustrator and writer
 Jon Scieszka (born 1954), children's writer
 David Shenk, writer and filmmaker
 Marilyn Singer (born 1948), children's writer
 Amy Sohn
 John Stoltenberg (born 1944), magazine editor
 Darin Strauss (born 1970), writer
 Ned Vizzini (1981–2013), novelist
 Brian Wood (born 1972), comic book creator
 Jacqueline Woodson (born 1963), writer
 William Upski Wimsatt (born 1972), author and political activist

Politicians
 Carol Bellamy (born 1942), former New York state senator and New York City Council president.
 James F. Brennan (born 1952), New York State Assembly member
 Hugh Carey (1919–2011), former governor of New York and U.S. representative.
 Bill de Blasio (born 1961), former New York City mayor.
 Francis Edwin Dorn, former U.S. representative
 Helen Gahagan Douglas, actress and former U.S. representative
 Patrick Gaspard, diplomat
 William Jay Gaynor, former New York City mayor
 Chris Hayes, journalist
 Brad Lander, New York City Council member
 Marty Markowitz, former New York state senator and Brooklyn borough president
 Chirlane McCray, writer and activist, married to Bill de Blasio
 Max Rose, U.S. representative
 Gene Russianoff, attorney and chief spokesman for the Straphangers Campaign
 Chuck Schumer, U.S. senator, former U.S. representative
 Anthony Weiner, former U.S. representative

Scientists
 Henry Petroski

Chess players
 Fabiano Caruana

Criminals
 Al Capone

See also 

 Streetcar suburb

References

Citations

Sources

External links 
 

 
Hipster neighborhoods
Neighborhoods in Brooklyn